Galina Atayeva (born 10 November 1971) is a Turkmenistan judoka. She competed at the 1996 Summer Olympics and the 2000 Summer Olympics.

References

External links
 

1971 births
Living people
Turkmenistan female judoka
Olympic judoka of Turkmenistan
Judoka at the 1996 Summer Olympics
Judoka at the 2000 Summer Olympics
Place of birth missing (living people)